Kinesuchus (meaning "one crocodile") is an extinct genus of crocodyliform peirosaurid from the Late Cretaceous Bajo de la Carpa Formation of Argentina. The type species, K. overoi, was described in 2018 from the holotype MAU-Pv-CO-583, a partial mandible.

See also 

 2018 in paleontology

References 

Peirosaurids
Santonian life
Late Cretaceous crocodylomorphs of South America
Cretaceous Argentina
Fossils of Argentina
Bajo de la Carpa Formation
Fossil taxa described in 2018
Prehistoric pseudosuchian genera